Rene Dasalla Dacquel (born 23 January 1991) is a Filipino professional boxer who held the WBC-OPBF super-flyweight title from 2016 to 2018. He reached a career high ranking of fifth for the IBF and tenth for the WBC at super-flyweight.

Professional career
In his first attempt at the OPBF Super Flyweight title, Dacquel lost to eventual world champion Takuma Inoue.

He later won the title defeating Go Onaga (elevating his former interim title status). Dacquel ultimately lost the title along with an attempt to win the World Boxing Association Oriental Super Flyweight title by decision to Andrew Moloney.

Dacquel has suffered a string of losses, including a loss to eventual world title challenger Jeo Santisima.

References

Living people
1992 births
People from Abra (province)
Filipino male boxers
Flyweight boxers
Super-flyweight boxers
Bantamweight boxers